PeachCare for Kids is a low-cost health insurance program for children of uninsured, low-income families in the U.S. state of Georgia who do not qualify for Medicaid. It is operated by the Georgia Department of Community Health.

History
In 1997, the United States Department of Health and Human Services (HHS) began the State Children's Health Insurance Program (SCHIP) to cover children from families whose incomes are low but too high for Medicaid. PeachCare for Kids was founded in 1999 as Georgia's SCHIP. As of 2009, an average of 1.4 million Georgians are enrolled.

References

External links
 PeachCare for Kids Homepage

Medical and health organizations based in Georgia (U.S. state)